Wania Monteiro (born 9 August 1986) is a Cape Verdean rhythmic gymnast.

Biography
Born 9 August 1986 in Santa Catarina, Santiago, she lived in Praia for a while. She is trained by Elena Atmacheva. Time noted that she often trained "in a dilapidated gym with ceilings too low to accommodate a proper hoop or ball toss", due to a lack of adequate facilities in Cape Verde.

She later moved to the USA for her studies.

Sports career
Monteiro represented her country at the 2004 Summer Olympics in Athens, and was Cape Verde's flag bearer during the Games's opening ceremony. She was also the first gymnast from Cape Verde to compete in the Olympic Games.

In 2006, she won four medals at the African Gymnastics Championships, three bronze and one gold, being present on all podiums during this competition.

Monteiro competed again at the 2008 Summer Olympics in Beijing, and was, again, her country's flagbearer during the Games' opening ceremony. She finished 24th, with 49.050 points.

References

External links
 Video of Monteiro's performance in Athens, on CNN's website
 
 
 

1986 births
Living people
Cape Verdean rhythmic gymnasts
Gymnasts at the 2004 Summer Olympics
Gymnasts at the 2008 Summer Olympics
Olympic gymnasts of Cape Verde
People from Santa Catarina, Cape Verde